Naratlıq is a rural locality (a derevnya) in Biektaw District, Tatarstan. The population was 182 as of 2010.

Geography 
Naratlıq is located 44 km northwest of Biektaw, district's administrative centre, and 78 km north of Qazan, republic's capital, by road.

History 
The village was established in 1988.

Since its establishment is a part of Biektaw district.

References

External links 
 

Rural localities in Vysokogorsky District